"Để Mị nói cho mà nghe" ("Let Mị tell you something") is a song by Vietnamese singer Hoàng Thùy Linh in her third studio album, Hoàng (2019). It was released by The Leader Entertainment on June 19, 2019 as the lead single from the album. The song was written by Thịnh Kainz, Kata Trần, T-Bass, and is produced by Kainz himself. "Để Mị nói cho mà nghe" has a pop soundtrack, blending world music, folktronica, and future bass. In the lyrics, the main character, Mị, expresses a desire to enjoy her youth by partying, inspired by the short story Vợ chồng A Phủ (1952).

"Để Mị nói cho mà nghe" received praise from both the public and professionals. The song won "Song of the Year" and "Music Video of the Year" from the Dedication Music Award 2020, and won a record six awards from Làn Sóng Xanh, as well as three awards from giải Mai Vàng (Golden Plum Award) and one award from WebTVAsia Awards 2019.

The music video of "Để Mị nói cho mà nghe" was officially released on YouTube on June 19, 2019. The video is directed by Nhu Đặng, who previously directed the winning video of the Dedication Music Award.

Live performances 
 ABU TV Song Festival 2019 in Japan
 Lễ Trao Giải Elle Style Award 2019
 V-Heartbeat Live 2019
 Sóng 20 HTV2 2020

Awards

Charts

Contributors 

 Thịnh Kainz, Kata Trần and T-Bass — composers
 Đoàn Hân — voice
 Thịnh Kainz — production
 Đinh Nhật Minh — sáo mèo

Release history

References 

2019 songs
2019 singles